Sir John Archibald Ford, KCMG, MC (19 February 1922 – 16 January 2018) was a British diplomat. He served as British Ambassador to Indonesia from 1975 to 1978 and British High Commissioner to Canada from 1978 to 1981.

Biography 
Ford was born in Newcastle-under-Lyme, the son of Ronald Mylne Ford, a solicitor, and Margaret Jesse Coghill. He was educated at College of St Michael and All Angels, Tenbury and Sedbergh School, before being called up for military service in 1941 He was commissioned into the Royal Artillery and was awarded the Military Cross in 1945 for “sustained gallantry, skill and devotion to duty, showing initiative and resource of the highest order” during the battle for Kervenheim in Germany. After the conclusion of the war in Europe, he was posted to Java, Dutch East Indies.

After being demobilized as a temporary Major, Ford went up to Oriel College, Oxford, where he read French and German. He then joined the Foreign Service (later the Diplomatic Service), and was posted to Budapest as a third secretary.

References 

 "Sir John Ford, diplomat – obituary", The Daily Telegraph, 19 April 2018
 "Sir John Ford", The Times, 5 March 2018

1922 births
2018 deaths
Knights Commander of the Order of St Michael and St George
Recipients of the Military Cross
Royal Artillery officers
British Army personnel of World War II
Ambassadors of the United Kingdom to Indonesia
High Commissioners of the United Kingdom to Canada
Alumni of Oriel College, Oxford
British expatriates in Hungary
Members of HM Diplomatic Service